Man, Myth & Magic may refer to:

Man, Myth & Magic (encyclopedia), a 1970s occult encyclopedia published in installments as a magazine
Man, Myth & Magic (role-playing game), a 1982 fantasy role-playing game by Yaquinto Publications
"Man, Myth & Magic", a song by Venom from the 2000 album Resurrection

See also
Profondo Argento: The Man, the Myths & the Magic, a 2004 biography of Dario Argento by Alan Jones
Myth and magic (disambiguation)